The qualifying heats and the finals of the Men's 400 metres Freestyle event at the European LC Championships 1995 were held on Friday 25 August 1995 in Vienna, Austria.

Finals

See also
1993 Men's European Championships (LC) 400m Freestyle
1995 Men's World Championships (SC) 400m Freestyle
1996 Men's Olympic Games 400m Freestyle
1997 Men's European Championships (LC) 400m Freestyle

References
 scmsom results
 swimrankings

F